Naken is a 2000 Swedish comedy film written and directed by Torkel and  Mårten Knutsson.  It stars Henrik Norberg as a naked man who is caught in a time loop on the day of his wedding.

Plot 
On the day of his wedding, Anders wakes up hungover and naked in an elevator after a stag party the day before.  As he attempts to piece together the reason for his predicament, the day repeats itself, and he becomes stuck in a time loop.

Cast 
Henrik Norberg - Anders (Stig Elvis) Karlsson 
Lisa Kock - Maria (Matilda) Märtelbom 
Martin Forsström - Pierre 
Anna Järphammar - Pernilla, Pierres partner 
Dan Malmer- Matte 
Ingela Sahlin - Vivianne Märtelbom, Marias mother
Lars G. Holmström - K.G. Märtelbom, Marias father
Marga Pettersson - Eva Karlsson, Anders mother
Tommy Johnson - Stig Karlsson, Anders father
Victoria Silvstedt - Rosita

Production 
During filming, the crew was almost struck by a car whose driver had fallen asleep.

Release 
To promote the film, the Knutsson brothers appeared naked at the Cannes Film Festival, after which they were arrested.

Reception 
Naken received negative reviews in Sweden.  Jens Peterson of Aftonbladet called it a poor copy of Groundhog Day that is not even "so bad it's good".

Remake 
In 2017, Netflix released an English-language, American remake starring Marlon Wayans and Regina Hall.  Michael Tiddes directed the movie.  Shooting took place in Charleston, South Carolina.

References

External links 
 
 
 Naken at the Swedish Film Institute

2000 films
2000 comedy films
Swedish comedy films
2000s Swedish-language films
Films about weddings
Time loop films
2000s Swedish films